Gianluca Bianchino (born May 13, 1977) is an Italian-American artist born in Avellino, Italy. A multi-media artist working in the realm of abstraction, his work is informed by science, philosophy and architecture. His installations are a mix of repurposed materials, projected imagery, cast light, shadows and drawing which create three-dimensional illusions that play with the physical space of the gallery. His installations reside in spaces in which he considers the walls to be large, flat canvases upon which he adds textures in the form of tripods, lenses, telescopes, umbrellas, solar panels and lighting equipment. The assemblages suggest scientific research and exploration - especially the detritus left behind, decaying and floating miles above the earth.  Playing with lights and cast shadows, he creates tangible futuristic spaces 
He lives and works in Newark, New Jersey.

Education 
Gianluca Bianchino attended an architectural magnet school in his home in Avellino before relocating to the United States. He later enrolled at New Jersey City University in Hudson County where he earned his bachelors of fine arts with a concentration in painting. He studied under Hugo Bastidas who influenced by conceptual process as a painter and artist.  During his time studying in Jersey City, his mentor Ben F. Jones, was instrumental in his artistic development, challenging him to engage in experimental art-making approaches with a political bent.  He later attended Montclair State University where he earned an MFA in 2011. He studied painting under Julie Heffernan before making the transition from painting to focus on sculpture and installation.  In transitioning from painting to multi-media work, Bianchino was a video production assistant for Robert Whitman's "Passport" conceived for the 500 seat Alexander Kasser Theater at Montclair State University.

Career 
It was during his MFA at Montclair that he began focusing his attention from pure painting in oil on canvas to turn his attention to his current multi-media sculptural practice which integrates notions related to shifting space, ordered chaos and notions of string theory which he attempts to explain visually.  Writer Shannon Hall likened to "an unchoreographed ballet" and notions of child-like wonder that permeates his work.

Bianchino has numerous artist-in-residence appointments including Ramapo College of New Jersey, The Center for New Art at William Paterson University, Gilbertsville Expressive Movement (Gilbertsville, New York) and Gallery Aferro (Newark, New Jersey). In 2016, Bianchino was selected as a resident artist at the Eileen S. Kaminsky Family Foundation based at Mana Contemporary in Jersey City, New Jersey. He was honored as a visiting artist at the Suzhou Culture and Art Centre in Suzhou, China in 2017 and invited to the R.A.I.D. Residency in Bologna, Italy later that same year.

Collections 
Walsh Gallery, Seton Hall University, South Orange, NJ
Gilbertsville Expressive Movement, Gilbertsville, NY
Eileen Kaminski Foundation (ESKFF)

References

1977 births
Living people
American artists
Artists from Newark, New Jersey
Italian emigrants to the United States
People from Avellino
Montclair State University alumni
New Jersey City University alumni